was a Fudai feudal domain under the Tokugawa shogunate of  Edo period Japan.  It was located in southeastern Ōmi Province, in the Kansai region of central Honshu. The domain was centered at Minakuchi Castle, located in what is now the city of Kōka in Shiga Prefecture.

History
Under Toyotomi Hideyoshi, Natsuka Masaie, one of the Go-Bugyō entrusted with the succession of Toyotomi Hideyori was granted a 50,000 koku fief in Ōmi Province. His kokudaka was later raised to 120,000 koku and he was based at Minakuchi Okayama Castle. However, he committed seppuku after the defeat of the Western Army at the Battle of Sekigahara and his territory was seized as tenryō by the new Tokugawa shogunate. In 1682, Minakuchi Domain was created for Kato Akitomo, a grandson of Tokugawa Ieyasu's famed general, Kato Yoshiaki and daimyō of the 10,000 koku Yoshinaga Domain in Iwami Province. He had amassed an additional 10,000 koku due to his own achievements, and was thus granted a total kokudaka of 20,000 koku. He brought in Kobori Enshū to help design the gardens of his new Minakuchi Castle. His son, Kato Akihide, served as jisha-bugyō followed by wakadoshiyori with a raise in kokudaka to 50,000 koku and a transfer to Mibu Domain in Shimotsuke Province in 1695. He was followed by Torii Tadateru who followed the same career path and was likewise transferred to Mibu Domain in 1712. Minakuchi Domain was then awarded back to an adopted son of Kato Akihide, who was demoted back from Mibu Domain and reduced to 25,000 koku. His descendants continued to rule Minakuchi until the Meiji restoration. In July 1871, with the abolition of the han system, Minakuchi Domain became Minakuchi Prefecture, and was merged into the newly created Shiga Prefecture in September 1871.

List of daimyō

{| class=wikitable
! #||Name || Tenure || Courtesy title || Court Rank || kokudaka
|-
|colspan=6|  Kato clan, 1682-1695 (Tozama)
|-
||1||||1682–1683||Kura-no-suke (内蔵助) || Junior 5th Rank, Lower Grade (従五位下)  ||20,000 koku
|-
||2||||1683–1695|| Etchū-no-kami (越中守) || Junior 5th Rank, Lower Grade (従五位下) ||20,000 koku
|-
|colspan=6|  Torii clan, 1695-1712 (Fudai)
|-
||1||||1695–1712||Iga-no-kami (伊賀守) || Junior 5th Rank, Lower Grade (従五位下) ||20,000 koku
|-
|colspan=6|   Kato clan, 1712 -1871 (Tozama Fudai)
|-
||1||||1712–1724||Izumi-no-kami (和泉守) || Junior 5th Rank, Lower Grade (従五位下) ||25,000 koku
|-
||2||||1724–1746||Ise-no-kami (伊勢守) || Junior 5th Rank, Lower Grade (従五位下) ||250,000 koku
|-
||3||||1746–1767||Sagami-no-kami (相模守)|| Junior 5th Rank, Lower Grade (従五位下) ||25,000 koku
|-
||4||||1767–1778||Ise-no-kami (伊勢守) || Junior 5th Rank, Lower Grade (従五位下) ||25,000 koku
|-
||5||||1778–1799||Sado-no-kami (佐渡守) || Junior 5th Rank, Lower Grade (従五位下) ||25,000 koku
|-
||6||||1799–1815|| Etchū-no-kami (越中守) || Junior 5th Rank, Lower Grade (従五位下) ||25,000 koku
|-
||7||||1815–1845|| Noto-no-kami (能登守) || Junior 5th Rank, Lower Grade (従五位下) ||25,000 koku
|-
||8||||1845–1866|| Etchū-no-kami (越中守) || Junior 5th Rank, Lower Grade (従五位下) ||25,000 koku
|-
||9||||1866–1871|| Noto-no-kami (能登守) (越中守) || Senior 3rd Rank (正三位) ||25,000 koku
|-
|}

Bakumatsu period holdings
As with most domains in the han system, Minakuchi Domain consisted of a discontinuous territories calculated to provide the assigned kokudaka, based on periodic cadastral surveys and projected agricultural yields.

Ōmi Province
35 villages in Kōka District
7 villages in Gamō District
4 villages in Sakata District

See also
List of Han

References
The content of this article was largely derived from that of the corresponding article on Japanese Wikipedia.

External links

Notes

Domains of Japan
1682 establishments in Japan
History of Shiga Prefecture
Ōmi Province